UConn Huskies basketball may refer to:

UConn Huskies men's basketball
UConn Huskies women's basketball